Aristeides John Roussinos is a British journalist and author. He was formerly a war reporter working for Vice News.

Early life and education 
Roussinos was educated at Haberdashers' Aske's Boys' School, Durham University (BA Anthropology, 2004) and the University of Oxford (MSc Social and Cultural Anthropology, 2005).

Career 
Roussinos was awarded the 2013 Rory Peck Award for News, for his report Ground Zero Mali: The Battle of Gao.

During the Arab Spring Roussinos travelled extensively with Islamic Front in Syria, anti-government fighters in Libya, as well as travelling to Mali, Sudan, South Sudan and Lebanon.

Roussinos is currently a contributing editor at UnHerd.

Publications 
 The Ghosts of Aleppo, Vice News, video series
 Rebels: My Life Behind Enemy Lines with Warlords, Fanatics and Not-so-Friendly Fire (2014), Random House, ISBN 978-1780892184

Family life 
Roussinos' mother died of a brain tumour while he was working in Libya, although he was able to travel home to see her before she died.

References

Year of birth missing (living people)
Living people
People educated at Haberdashers' Boys' School
Alumni of Van Mildert College, Durham
Alumni of the University of Oxford
Place of birth missing (living people)
British male writers